Adrian Jarrell Davis (born July 6, 1989) is a former American football cornerback. He played college football at Jacksonville State University and attended Clay-Chalkville High School in Clay, Alabama. He has been a member of the New Orleans Saints of the National Football League (NFL).

College career
Davis played for the Jacksonville State Gamecocks from 2008 to 2011. He was redshirted in 2007.

Professional career
Davis was signed by the New Orleans Saints on May 1, 2012 after going undrafted in the 2012 NFL Draft. He made his NFL debut on December 30, 2012 against the Carolina Panthers. He became a free agent on March 10, 2015.

References

External links
Just Sports Stats

Living people
1989 births
Players of American football from Birmingham, Alabama
American football cornerbacks
African-American players of American football
Jacksonville State Gamecocks football players
New Orleans Saints players
People from Clay, Alabama
21st-century African-American sportspeople
20th-century African-American people